The  is a railway line that links Nara Prefecture to Wakayama Prefecture in Japan, operated by West Japan Railway Company (JR West). It connects Ōji Station on the Yamatoji Line to Wakayama Station on the Hanwa Line and Kisei Main Line, with through train service to JR Namba via the Yamatoji Line and to Nara via the Sakurai Line.

Stations

Rolling stock
 227 series (from Spring 2019, with through services to the Sakurai Line)
 221 series (only through rapid services to JR Namba via the Yamatoji Line)
 201 series (only some through services to the Yamatoji Line)

Former rolling stocks
 103 series (until 2018)
 105 series (until 2020)
 117 series (until 2020)

History
The section between Oji and Takada was opened in 1891 by the Osaka Railway. The Minami Kazu Railway opened the Takada to Yoshinoguchi section in 1896, and extended the line to Gojo in 1898, the same year the Kiwa Railway opened the Gojo to Hashimoto section, extending it to Wakayama in 1900, the year the Osaka Railway merged with the Kansai Railway.

The line was electrified in 1980.

See also
 List of railway lines in Japan

References

Lines of West Japan Railway Company
Rail transport in Nara Prefecture
Rail transport in Wakayama Prefecture
Railway lines opened in 1896
1067 mm gauge railways in Japan
1896 establishments in Japan